Wim De Coninck (born 23 June 1959) is a retired Belgian footballer.

During his career he played for K.S.V. Waregem, Royal Antwerp F.C., K.A.A. Gent, and R.S.C. Anderlecht. He participated in UEFA Euro 1984, but did not earn any senior international caps in his career.

Honours

Player 
Waregem
 Belgian Cup: runner-up 1981–82
 Belgian Supercup: 1982
 UEFA Cup: 1985–86 (semi-finals)
Tournoi de Paris: 1985

Royal Antwerp
 Belgian Cup: 1991–92
 UEFA Cup Winners' Cup: runner-up 1992–93

References

External links
Royal Belgian Football Association: Number of caps

1959 births
Living people
Footballers from East Flanders
Belgian footballers
UEFA Euro 1984 players
K.S.V. Waregem players
Royal Antwerp F.C. players
K.A.A. Gent players
R.S.C. Anderlecht players
S.C. Eendracht Aalst players
Belgian Pro League players
Belgian football managers
Royal Antwerp F.C. managers
S.C. Eendracht Aalst managers
Association football goalkeepers
People from Deinze